NZV8 is a monthly automotive magazine and website that focuses on V8 cars, car clubs and the related culture predominantly in New Zealand, but also Australia and the USA. Its readership was 96,000 in 2011. It was the third automotive magazine to be published by Parkside Media, the other two being NZ Performance Car and NZ Classic Car.

NZV8'''s offices are in Grey Lynn, Auckland, New Zealand. The magazine's tagline was originally Feel the power. It was changed in issue 32 (January 2008) to NZ's top circuit, strip and street machines.Magazine contents

As of the December 2008 issue (#43), the typical magazine contents include:

Feature car reviews
Event overviews (such as drag racing, V8 Supercars, car club meets, etc.)
New car and car tuner news from around the world
Editor and contributor columns
Driver interviews (for example Andy Booth)
Scale model reviews
Book reviews
Events calendar
Drag racing records
Readers’ letters

Website
Daily news articles are available weekdays which are additional to magazine content. Full magazine articles are available from previous issues, often including additional photos and information (including videos) that could not be fitted into the magazine. Some writers run blogs on the website, and a forum is run as a subsite to encourage user interaction.

Users can purchase books related to muscle cars, Pony cars, V8s and motorsport, as well as back issues and subscriptions in the online shop.

Online games
Jetsprint Legends is the first game in the world to feature jet boat racing on New Zealand's jet boat tracks.

Television
The inaugural season of NZV8 TV was broadcast in 2009 over 13 weeks as a part of Powerbuilt Tools Motorsport on TV1, Sunday afternoons.

Editorial staff
Editor Todd Wylie was former assistant editor of NZ Performance Car magazine.

Notable contributors
V8 Supercar driver Jason Richards has a monthly column. New Zealand V8s driver Andy Booth presents NZV8 TV.

Government policy
Like its sister publication NZ Classic Car NZV8'' has supported various parties in lobbying Land Transport NZ for easing rules on car modification, frontal impact laws for low volume vehicle certification and steering systems. It is recognised by the V8 industry as working for their benefit.

Awards
Publisher Greg Vincent received the Meguiar's Collector's Car Person of the Year Award.

References

External links
NZV8 Official Website
Roadside Assistance Website
Supercar Blondie Team Members

Automobile magazines
Automotive websites
Magazines established in 2005
Mass media in Auckland
Magazines published in New Zealand
2005 establishments in New Zealand
Automotive industry in New Zealand
Monthly magazines published in New Zealand